Flog may refer to:

Fake blog, an astroturfing technique
Flagellation or flogging, beating the human body with special implements such as whips
 The Flog, a video blog by Felicia Day
 Food blog, a blog dedicated to food; see Glossary of blogging

See also
 Flogger (disambiguation)